The Gambler may refer to:

Gambler, a person who gambles

Film and television

Films
 The Gambler (1919 film), a German silent film
 The Gambler (1938 film), a German film
 The Gambler (1958 film), a French-Italian film
 Gambler (film), a 1971 Indian Bollywood film directed by Amarjeet
 The Gambler (1974 film), an American film starring James Caan and Paul Sorvino
 The Gambler (film series), a 1980–1994 American TV movie series starring Kenny Rogers, based on his song "The Gambler"
 The Gambler (1989 film), a Russian film directed by Sergei Bodrov
 The Gambler (1995 film), a Bollywood film directed by Dayal Nihalani
 The Gambler (1997 film), a Dutch-Hungarian-British film about Dostoyevsky writing his novella, directed by Károly Makk
 The Gambler (2013 film), a Lithuanian film directed by Ignas Jonynas
 The Gambler (2014 film), an American remake of the 1974 film
 The Gambler (2019 film), an Indian Malayalam-language superhero film

Television episodes
 "The Gambler" (He-Man and the Masters of the Universe)
 "The Gambler" (Matlock)
 "The Gambler" (The Transformers)

Literature
 The Gambler (novel), an 1867 short novel by Fyodor Dostoyevsky
 "The Gambler" (Bacigalupi story), a 2008 novelette by Paolo Bacigalupi
 The Gambler (Il giocatore), a 1950 play by Ugo Betti
 Gambler (comics), two DC Comics supervillains
 Gambler (magazine), a 1993–1999 Polish video game monthly

Music 
The Gambler (Prokofiev), a 1917 opera by Prokofiev based on Dostoyevsky's novella
The Gambler (album), by Kenny Rogers, 1978
"The Gambler" (song), the title song
Gambler (album), a musical by Eric Woolfson, 1996
The Gambler (EP), by Mike Doughty, 2005
"Gambler" (song), by Madonna, 1985
"The Gambler", a song by Fun from Aim and Ignite, 2009
"The Gambler", a song by Ray Manzarek from The Whole Thing Started with Rock & Roll Now It's Out of Control, 1974

People
The Gambler (wrestler), Jeffrey Gann, American professional wrestler
Kenny Rogers (1938–2020), country singer
Kenny Rogers (baseball) (born 1964)

Other uses
 Gambler (board game), a 1975 Parker Brothers game
 The Gambler (custom car), winner of the 1988 Detroit Autorama Ridler Award

See also

The Gamblers (disambiguation)
Gamblerz, a South Korean b-boy crew, formerly known as Gambler Crew
Gamble (disambiguation)
The Mississippi Gambler (disambiguation)
Gamer (disambiguation)